The men's  coxless four competition at the 1948 Summer Olympics in London took place at Henley-on-Thames, London.

Results
The following rowers took part:

References

External links
 Official Olympic Report

Rowing at the 1948 Summer Olympics